The Old Bridgewater Historical Society was founded in 1894 in West Bridgewater, Massachusetts. It is a 501(c)(3) non-profit organization. The society operates from two buildings and has a library of genealogical and historical texts, manuscripts, documents, and photographs, as well as historical artifacts.

Buildings 
 
The society owns two buildings in West Bridgewater: The Memorial Building, located at 162 Howard Street, and the Keith House located around the corner at 199 River Street.

Memorial Building 
Francis E. Howard, son of Capt. Benjamin Beal Howard, a resident of Howard Street in West Bridgewater, donated the property that the Memorial Building sits on in 1899, on the condition that the building cost no less than $5,000 to build.  A building committee was created, consisting of Hon. Benjamin W. Harris of East Bridgewater, Dr. Loring W. Puffer of Brockton, Francis E. Howard and Charles R. Packard of West Bridgewater, Henry Gurney and Simeon C. Keith of East Bridgewater, the Hon. Ziba C. Keith of Brockton, and Joshua E. Crane and Samuel P. Gates of Bridgewater.  In order to assist in raising the remaining funds needed, the Society sold marble plaques at a cost of $100 each to commemorate some of Old Bridgewater's founding families.  These plaques were mounted on the interior walls of the building.

The building was designed by Boston architect firm Cooper & Bailey.  It was constructed by the Brockton building company Crowell & Briggs, at a cost of approximately $8,000.  Ground breaking occurred on June 29, 1900, and the building was dedicated at a ceremony on June 13, 1901.

The Memorial Building is of a colonial style of architecture.  The main room contains a large open space with a stage on one end, and there is an alcove on either side, one named the Keith Alcove and the other the Howard Alcove, in honor of two of the earlier settlers of the county.  The building was constructed of water struck red brick with a slate roof, in an effort to make the building and its historical holdings as safe from fire hazards as possible.  A walk-out basement extends underneath the entire structure.

Rev. James Keith Parsonage 
The Keith Parsonage is owned by the society and is operated as a colonial home museum.  Construction of the building began in approximately the Spring of 1662, and it was originally occupied by Bridgewater's first permanent minister, the young Rev. James Keith from Scotland.  The home was donated to the society on November 29, 1961 by Howard and Jessie Anderson..

History
The society was founded in 1894 and incorporated on July 18, 1895.  The original officers were: Benjamin W. Harris (president), Frank E. Sweet (secretary), Isaac N. Nutter (treasurer), Francis E. Howard, Loring W. Puffer, George M. Hooper, Joshua E. Crane, Capt. Benjamin Beal Howard, and Hosea Kingman.

Society presidents 

 Benjamin W. Harris       1895-1905 
  Loring Puffer 1905-1907
 Robert O. Harris         1907-1913
 G. E. Dyer 1913-1921
 Charles E. Lovell 1921-1924
 Edward Keith 1924-1926
 Abner Braley 1926-1938
 Percival Churchill 1938-1939
 Walter Stephens 1939-1945
 Edmund Nutter 1945-1950
 Laurist W. Reynolds 1950-1957
 Ralph S. Bates 1957-1976
 Robert E. Ashley 1976-1977
 Robert D. Bevis 1977-1980
 Francis J. Beary 1980-1985
 Diana Lothrop 1985-1989
 James F. Buckley 1989-1990
 Lawrence "Larry" Conant 1990-1995
 Diana Lothrop 1995-1999
 Maureen Lynn 1999-2016
 Shellie Karol-Chik 2016–Present

References

External links
Society website

History museums in Massachusetts
Museums in Plymouth County, Massachusetts